George Edward Turner (born 8 October 1992) is a Scottish international rugby union player who plays hooker for Pro14 team Glasgow Warriors.

Club career

Turner was drafted to Currie in the Scottish Premiership for the 2017-18 season.

Turner was drafted to Ayr in the Scottish Premiership for the 2018-19 season.

Turner made his Edinburgh Rugby debut off the bench in October 2014.

On 27 July 2017 it was announced that Turner would be joining Glasgow Warriors on loan for the season 2017-18.

Turner played his first match for the Warriors on 25 August 2017 coming on as a substitute against Dragons in a 40-23 away win.

International career

Turner received his first call up to the senior Scotland squad on 22 February 2016 for the 2016 Six Nations Championship. However he was replaced in the squad by Fraser Brown on 7 March 2016.

Turner made his international debut from the bench in November 2017 as Scotland opened their Autumn International series with a 44-38 victory over Samoa.

In June 2018 Turner was selected for Scotland's summer tour of the Americas, and achieved the unusual feat for a hooker of scoring a hat-trick in the victory over Canada.

References

External links
 
 George Turner Edinburgh Rugby profile

1992 births
Living people
Scottish rugby union players
Edinburgh Rugby players
People educated at Stewart's Melville College
Glasgow Warriors players
Currie RFC players
Scotland international rugby union players
Ayr RFC players
London Scottish F.C. players
Rugby union players from Edinburgh
Rugby union hookers